Lviv is a city in the eponymous raion of the eponymous oblast in western Ukraine.

Lviv may also refer to:

Places
 Lviv Raion, Lviv Oblast, Ukraine
 Lviv Oblast, Ukraine
 Lviv Oblast Council
 Old Town (Lviv), Lviv, Lviv Raion, Lviv Oblast, Ukraine
 Lviv Ghetto (WWII), Lviv, Ukraine

Facilities and structures
 Lviv High Castle, Lviv, Lviv Raion, Lviv Oblast, Ukraine
 Lviv Danylo Halytskyi International Airport, Lviv, Lviv Raion, Lviv Oblast, Ukraine
 Lviv railway station, Lviv, Ukraine
 Arena Lviv, Lviv, Ukraine; a soccer stadium
 Lviv Theatre of Opera and Ballet, Lviv, Ukraine

Groups, companies, organizations
 FC Lviv, Lviv, Ukraine; a soccer team
 Lviv Airlines
 Lviv Railways
 Ukrainian Catholic Archeparchy of Lviv

Other uses
 Battle of Lviv (disambiguation)

See also

 University of Lviv, Lviv, Ukraine
 Lviv Conservatory, Lviv, Ukraine; a music academy
 Lviv University of Trade and Economics, Lviv, Ukraine
 Lviv Polytechnic University, Lviv, Ukraine
 Lviv National Agrarian University, Lviv, Ukraine
 Lviv State University of Physical Culture, Lviv, Ukraine
 Danylo Halytsky Lviv National Medical University, Lviv, Ukraine
 Lviv National Stepan Gzhytsky University of Veterinary Medicine and Biotechnology, Lviv, Ukraine
 Lviv pogrom (disambiguation)
 Lviv Stadium (disambiguation)
 
 Lwów (disambiguation)
 Lvov (disambiguation)
 Lemberg (disambiguation)